The 1958 IFA Shield Final was the 66th final of the IFA Shield, the second oldest football competition in India, and was contested between Kolkata giants East Bengal and Mohun Bagan on 26 September 1958 first which ended in a draw and then a replay on 29 January 1952 at the East Bengal–Mohun Bagan Ground and Calcutta Ground in Kolkata respectively.

East Bengal won the replayed final 1–0 to claim their 6th IFA Shield title. B.Narayan scored the only goal in the replay final as East Bengal lifted their sixth IFA Shield title.

Route to the final

Match

Summary
The IFA Shield final began at the East Bengal-Mohun Bagan Ground in Kolkata on 26 September 1958 in front of a packed crowd as Kolkata giants East Bengal and Mohun Bagan faced each other in a Kolkata Derby. East Bengal reached their tenth final after defeating Andhra Police 1–0 in the semi-final, having won the title five times previously in 1943, 1945, 1949, 1950, and 1951. Mohun Bagan made their twelfth appearance in the final after they defeated another Kolkata giant Mohammedan Sporting 1–0 in the semi-final, having won it six times previously in 1911, 1947, 1948, 1952, 1954, and 1956. 

Mohun Bagan started the attack in the very first minute as Pansanttom Venkatesh crossed a ball towards K. Pal but the latter could not bring it down under control and made a handball. East Bengal countered in the next minute as Musa Ghazi headed a ball from a cross from B. Narayan but was saved by the Bagan custodian Abani Bose safely. Mohun Bagan took the lead in the twentieth minute after Samar Banerjee received a pass from Chuni Goswami and found the net with a powerful shot to make it 1–0. East Bengal equalized just in the very next minute after Mariappa Kempaiah volleyed the ball into his own goal trying to clear a shot from Hassan as the game leveled at 1–1 before halftime. Both teams tried to break the deadlock in the second half but canceled each other out as the game ended in a draw. The IFA decided to host a replayed final of the match later due to the unavailability of dates.

Details

Replay

Summary
The replay final began at the Calcutta Ground in Kolkata on 29 January 1952 after the first game ended in a 1–1 stalemate.

The match began at a fast pace as both teams tried to break the deadlock but canceled each other out in the first half as the game remained goalless. The breakthrough came in the third minute of the second half when B. Narayan latched onto a freekick from Tulsidas Balaram and took a powerful shot that hit the crossbar and hit goalkeeper Abani Bose and found the back of the net as East Bengal took a 1–0 lead. Mohun Bagan tried to make a comeback but the East Bengal defense led by Ram Bahadur Chettri held firm and the match ended in a 1–0 victory for East Bengal as they lifted their sixth IFA Shield title.

Details

References

External links
IFA Shield Finals

IFA Shield finals
1958–59 in Indian football
East Bengal Club matches
Mohun Bagan AC matches
Football competitions in Kolkata